A cartoon is a type of visual art that is typically drawn, frequently animated, in an unrealistic or semi-realistic style. The specific meaning has evolved over time, but the modern usage usually refers to either: an image or series of images intended for satire, caricature, or humor; or a motion picture that relies on a sequence of illustrations for its animation. Someone who creates cartoons in the first sense is called a cartoonist, and in the second sense they are usually called an animator.

The concept originated in the Middle Ages, and first described a preparatory drawing for a piece of art, such as a painting, fresco, tapestry, or stained glass window. In the 19th century, beginning in Punch magazine in 1843, cartoon came to refer – ironically at first – to humorous artworks in magazines and newspapers. Then it also was used for political cartoons and comic strips. When the medium developed, in the early 20th century, it began to refer to animated films which resembled print cartoons.

Fine art

Cartoons were typically used in the production of frescoes, to accurately link the component parts of the composition when painted on damp plaster over a series of days (giornate). In media such as stained tapestry or stained glass, the cartoon was handed over by the artist to the skilled craftsmen who produced the final work. 

Such cartoons often have pinpricks along the outlines of the design so that a bag of soot patted or "pounced" over a cartoon, held against the wall, would leave black dots on the plaster ("pouncing"). Cartoons by painters, such as the Raphael Cartoons in London, and examples by Leonardo da Vinci, are highly prized in their own right. Tapestry cartoons, usually colored, were followed with the eye by the weavers on the loom.

Mass media

In print media, a cartoon is an drawing or series of drawings, usually humorous in intent. This usage dates from 1843, when Punch magazine applied the term to satirical drawings in its pages, particularly sketches by John Leech. The first of these parodied the preparatory cartoons for grand historical frescoes in the then-new Palace of Westminster. 

Sir John Tenniel—illustrator of Alice's Adventures in Wonderland—joined Punch in 1850, and over 50 years contributed over two thousand cartoons.

Cartoons can be divided into gag cartoons, which include editorial cartoons, and comic strips.

Modern single-panel gag cartoons, found in magazines, generally consist of a single drawing with a typeset caption positioned beneath, or, less often, a speech balloon. Newspaper syndicates have also distributed single-panel gag cartoons by Mel Calman, Bill Holman, Gary Larson, George Lichty, Fred Neher and others. Many consider New Yorker cartoonist Peter Arno the father of the modern gag cartoon (as did Arno himself). The roster of magazine gag cartoonists includes Charles Addams, Charles Barsotti, and Chon Day.

Bill Hoest, Jerry Marcus, and Virgil Partch began as magazine gag cartoonists and moved to syndicated comic strips. Richard Thompson illustrated numerous feature articles in The Washington Post before creating his Cul de Sac comic strip. The sports section of newspapers usually featured cartoons, sometimes including syndicated features such as Chester "Chet" Brown's All in Sport.

Editorial cartoons are found almost exclusively in news publications and news websites. Although they also employ humor, they are more serious in tone, commonly using irony or satire. The art usually acts as a visual metaphor to illustrate a point of view on current social or political topics. Editorial cartoons often include speech balloons and sometimes use multiple panels. Editorial cartoonists of note include Herblock, David Low, Jeff MacNelly, Mike Peters, and Gerald Scarfe.

Comic strips, also known as cartoon strips in the United Kingdom, are found daily in newspapers worldwide, and are usually a short series of cartoon illustrations in sequence. In the United States, they are not commonly called "cartoons" themselves, but rather "comics" or "funnies". Nonetheless, the creators of comic strips—as well as comic books and graphic novels—are usually referred to as "cartoonists". Although humor is the most prevalent subject matter, adventure and drama are also represented in this medium. Some noteworthy cartoonists of humorous comic strips are Scott Adams, Charles Schulz, E. C. Segar, Mort Walker and Bill Watterson.

Political

Political cartoons are like illustrated editorial that serve visual commentaries on political events. They offer subtle criticism which are cleverly quoted with humour and satire to the extent that the criticized does not get embittered.

The pictorial satire of William Hogarth is regarded as a precursor to the development of political cartoons in 18th century England. George Townshend produced some of the first overtly political cartoons and caricatures in the 1750s. The medium began to develop in the latter part of the 18th century under the direction of its great exponents, James Gillray and Thomas Rowlandson, both from London. Gillray explored the use of the medium for lampooning and caricature, and has been referred to as the father of the political cartoon. By calling the king, prime ministers and generals to account for their behaviour, many of Gillray's satires were directed against George III, depicting him as a pretentious buffoon, while the bulk of his work was dedicated to ridiculing the ambitions of revolutionary France and Napoleon. George Cruikshank became the leading cartoonist in the period following Gillray, from 1815 until the 1840s. His career was renowned for his social caricatures of English life for popular publications.

By the mid 19th century, major political newspapers in many other countries featured cartoons commenting on the politics of the day. Thomas Nast, in New York City, showed how realistic German drawing techniques could redefine American cartooning. His 160 cartoons relentlessly pursued the criminal characteristic of the Tweed machine in New York City, and helped bring it down. Indeed, Tweed was arrested in Spain when police identified him from Nast's cartoons. In Britain, Sir John Tenniel was the toast of London. In France under the July Monarchy, Honoré Daumier took up the new genre of political and social caricature, most famously lampooning the rotund King Louis Philippe.

Political cartoons can be humorous or satirical, sometimes with piercing effect. The target of the humor may complain, but can seldom fight back. Lawsuits have been very rare; the first successful lawsuit against a cartoonist in over a century in Britain came in 1921, when J. H. Thomas, the leader of the National Union of Railwaymen (NUR), initiated libel proceedings against the magazine of the British Communist Party. Thomas claimed defamation in the form of cartoons and words depicting the events of "Black Friday", when he allegedly betrayed the locked-out Miners' Federation. To Thomas, the framing of his image by the far left threatened to grievously degrade his character in the popular imagination. Soviet-inspired communism was a new element in European politics, and cartoonists unrestrained by tradition tested the boundaries of libel law. Thomas won the lawsuit and restored his reputation.

Scientific
Cartoons such as xkcd have also found their place in the world of science, mathematics, and technology. For example, the cartoon Wonderlab looked at daily life in the chemistry lab.  In the U.S., one well-known cartoonist for these fields is Sidney Harris. Many of Gary Larson's cartoons have a scientific flavor.

Comic books

 
Books with cartoons are usually magazine-format "comic books," or occasionally reprints of newspaper cartoons.

In Britain in the 1930s adventure magazines became quite popular, especially those published by DC Thomson; the publisher sent observers around the country to talk to boys and learn what they wanted to read about. The story line in magazines, comic books and cinema that most appealed to boys was the glamorous heroism of British soldiers fighting wars that were exciting and just.  DC Thomson issued the first The Dandy Comic in December 1937. It had a revolutionary design that broke away from the usual children's comics that were published broadsheet in size and not very colourful.  Thomson capitalized on its success with a similar product The Beano  in 1938.

On some occasions, new gag cartoons have been created for book publication, as was the case with Think Small, a 1967 promotional book distributed as a giveaway by Volkswagen dealers. Bill Hoest and other cartoonists of that decade drew cartoons showing Volkswagens, and these were published along with humorous automotive essays by such humorists as H. Allen Smith, Roger Price and Jean Shepherd. The book's design juxtaposed each cartoon alongside a photograph of the cartoon's creator.

Animation

Because of the stylistic similarities between comic strips and early animated films, cartoon came to refer to animation, and the word cartoon is currently used in reference to both animated cartoons and gag cartoons.  While animation designates any style of illustrated images seen in rapid succession to give the impression of movement, the word "cartoon" is most often used as a descriptor for television programs and short films aimed at children, possibly featuring anthropomorphized animals, superheroes, the adventures of child protagonists or related themes.

In the 1980s, cartoon was shortened to toon, referring to characters in animated productions. This term was popularized in 1988 by the combined live-action/animated film Who Framed Roger Rabbit, followed in 1990 by the animated TV series Tiny Toon Adventures.

See also

Billy Ireland Cartoon Library & Museum
Caricature
Comics
Comics studies
Histoire de M. Vieux Bois
List of comic strips
List of cartoonists
List of editorial cartoonists
Teen humor comics

References

Bibliography

External links

 Dan Becker, History of Cartoons
 Marchand collection cartoons and photos
 Stamp Act 1765 with British and American cartoons
 "Graphic Witness" political caricatures in history
 Keppler cartoons
 current editorial cartoons
Index of cartoonists in the Fred Waring Collection
International Society for Humor Studies
 Harper's Weekly 150 cartoons on elections 1860–1912; Reconstruction topics; Chinese exclusion; plus American Political Prints from the Library of Congress, 1766–1876

 

 
Visual arts genres
Film and video terminology
Film genres
1843 introductions